Electoral results for the district of Mulgrave may refer to:

 Electoral results for the district of Mulgrave (Queensland)
 Electoral results for the district of Mulgrave (Victoria)